Luke Dollman is an Australian conductor. Dollman is a violinist who moved into conducting. Together with the Greta Bradman, the Adelaide Symphony Orchestra and the Adelaide Chamber Singers, Dollman was nominated for the 2018 ARIA Award for Best Classical Album for the album Home.

Discography

Albums

Awards and nominations

ARIA Music Awards
The ARIA Music Awards are presented annually from 1987 by the Australian Recording Industry Association (ARIA).

! 
|-
| 2018
| Home (with Greta Bradman, Adelaide Symphony Orchestra & Adelaide Chamber Singers)
| Best Classical Album
| 
|

References

External links
Official website

Australian musicians
Living people
Year of birth missing (living people)